Roy Cheung Yiu-Yeung (born 20 July 1963 in Hong Kong) is a Hong Kong-based actor, best known on-screen for his roles as Triad gangsters in a number of films.

Early life and career 
As a child, Cheung idolized kung-fu legend Bruce Lee but never seriously considered a career in acting.

Starting out as a model, Cheung turned to acting when director Yeung Fan cast him in his 1986 film Lost Romance and the first of his many roles portraying a villain followed in the acclaimed director Ringo Lam's 1987 City on Fire.

In 1996, Cheung appeared in the 3rd, 4th and 6th installments of the Young and Dangerous series. Roles that heralded the beginning of a long working relationship with director/cinematographer Andrew Lau.

Present day 
Recently, Cheung has appeared in a number of Andrew Lau's films, most notably in the second installment of the internationally acclaimed Infernal Affairs trilogy, and in the 1998 The Storm Riders, in which Cheung broke free of his standard villainous self altogether and portrayed a Shaolin monk.

Filmography 
Lost Romance (1986)
Escape from Coral Cove (1986) - Roy
City on Fire (1987)
Prison on Fire (1987)
The Big Heat (1988)
School on Fire (1988)
Tiger on the Beat 2 (1988)
Aces Go Places 5: The Terracotta Hit (1989) - Murderer King
They Came to Rob Hong Kong (1989)
Wild Search (1989)
Triads: The Inside Story (1989)
Chicken a La Queen (1990)
Fight Back to School (1991) - Brother Teddy Big
Hong Kong Godfather (1991) - Officer Leung
In the Lap of God (1991) - Roy
The Magnificent Scoundrels (1991) - Brother Tai-te
My Flying Wife (1991) - Mr. Smartie
Prison on Fire II (1991) - Officer 'Scarface' Hung
Rose (1992)
Shanghai Heroic Story (1992)
What a Hero! (1992)
Wicked City (1992) - Shudo
Ghost Lantern (1993)
Gambling Baron (1994)
Organized Crime & Triad Bureau (film) (1994)
To Live and Die in Tsimshatsui (1994)
The Tragic Fantasy - Tiger of Wanchai (1994)
The Armed Policewoman (1995)
From the Same Family (1995)
High Voltage (1995)
Love, Guns & Glass (1995)
Best of the Best (1996)
King of Robbery (1996)
Mongkok Story (1996)
Once Upon a Time in Triad Society 2 (1996)
Those Were the Days (1996)
The Wild Couple (1996)
Young and Dangerous 3 (1996) - Crow
Young and Dangerous 4 (1997) - Lui Yiu-Yeung
Beast Cops (1998)
Leopard Hunting (1998)
Raging Angels (1998)
The Storm Riders (1998)
Big Spender (1999)
The Mission (1999)
Slow Fade (1999)
Born to Be King (2000)
Jiang hu: The Triad Zone (2000)
Bloody Cops (2000)
Mafia.com (2000)
Play With Strangers (2000)
Super Car Criminals (2000)
Unbeatables (2000)
White Storm (2000)
Her Name is Cat 2: Journey to Death (2001)
The Replacement Suspects (2001)
The Avenging Fist (2001)
Chinese Odyssey 2002 (2002)
The Wesley's Mysterious File (2002)
Deadline Crisis (2002)
Infernal Affairs II (2003)
Dragon the Master (2003)
Brothers (2004)
The Game of Killing (2004)
Colour of the Loyalty (2005)
Moonlight in Tokyo (2005)
Exiled (2006)
The Drummer (2007)
Mini (2007)
Linger (2008)
A Land without Boundaries (2011)
The Assassins (2012)
The Five (2012)

References

External links 

Hong Kong male film actors
1963 births
Living people
Indigenous inhabitants of the New Territories in Hong Kong
20th-century Hong Kong male actors
21st-century Hong Kong male actors